The 1978–79 Kansas Jayhawks men's basketball team represented the University of Kansas during the 1978–79 NCAA Division I men's basketball season.

Roster
Darnell Valentine
Paul Mokeski
John Crawford
Wilmore Fowler
Tony Guy
Douglas Booty Neal
Dave Magley
Mac Stallcup
Brad Sanders
Chester Giles
Randolph Carroll
Mark Snow

Schedule

References

Kansas Jayhawks men's basketball seasons
Kansas
Kansas Jay
Kansas Jay